Lećevica is a village and a municipality in Croatia in the Split-Dalmatia County. It has a population of 583 (2011 census), 95% of which are Croats. In this municipality  there is Keva's pit cave.

References

Populated places in Split-Dalmatia County
Municipalities of Croatia